In Her Own Image: Women Working in the Arts is an American feminist anthology published by Feminist Press from Old Westbury, New York on March 1, 1980, and is a part of the Press’ larger series entitled “Women’s Lives, Women’s Work”. Edited by Ingrid Wendt and Elaine Hedges, the book showcases an array of women's works—"poetry, fiction, journal writing, sculpture, painting, pottery, quilts, music, and dance." The magazine, Gay Community News, gives even more examples of what the anthology included, such as: autobiography, essay, letter writing, graphics, and photography. It contains four sections: Household Work and Women’s Art, Obstacles and Challenges, Definitions and Discoveries, and Women’s Art and Social Change. The selections in the anthology illuminate the works from the perspective of the artist. The women’s places in society affected the art they contributed. The anthology was not expensive to create. Ann Sutherland Harris, a co-author of Women Artists: 1550:1950, once described it as "a fascinating potpourri... This anthology should be read by anyone interested in women artists."

Included Artists

ONE: Everyday Use (Household Work and Women's Art) 

 Margaret Tafoya
 Elaine Hedges 
 Sarah Barker
 Harriet Powers
 Mary Fish
 Alice Walker
 Marge Piercy
 Diane Wakoski
 Lucy Larcom
 Doris Ulmann
 Glen Corbett Povey
 Sue Fuller
 Mary Cassatt
 Fede Galizia
 Joan Aleshire
 Bethami Auerbach
 Jessamyn West
 Miriam Schapiro

TWO: Becoming an Artist (Obstacles and Challenges) 

 Virginia Woolf
 Anne Bradstreet 
 Charlotte Brontë
 Emily Dickinson
 May Swenson
 Gertrude Käsebier
 Frances Benjamin Johnston
 Michele Murray
 Olivia Evey Chapa
 Erica Jong
 May Sarton
 Susan Griffin
 Ingrid Wendt
 Hortense Calisher
 Patti Warashina
 Ruth Whitman
 Dorothea Tanning
 Adrienne Rich
 Ellen Bass
 Judy Chicago

THREE: Their Own Images (Definitions and Discoveries) 

 Lucille Clifton
 Lisel Mueller
 Kathleen Fraser
 Paula Modersohn-Becker
 Frida Kahlo
 Marisol
 Marcia Marcus
 Niki de Saint-Phalle
 Wendy Rose
 Carmen Lomas Garza
 Jade Snow Wong
 Rolinda Sharples
 Adélaïde Labille-Guiard
 Angelica Kauffmann
 Elizabeth Barrett Browning
 Emily Dickinson
 Barbara Morgan
 Linda Pastan

FOUR: Lend Your Hands (Women's Art and Social Change) 

 Kaethe Kollwitz
 Muriel Rukeyser
 Holly Near
 Bernice Reagon
 Betye Saar
 Lower East Side Collective
 Wallflower Order
 Judy Chicago and The Dinner Party Project
 Adrienne Rich
 Muriel Rukeyser

References 
 Hedges, Elaine, and Ingrid Wendt. “In Her Own Image: Women Working in the Arts.” Woman’s Art Journal 1982: 61–62. Web.

 "In Her Own Image". Feminist Press. Retrieved 2021-03-11.

 Kingsbury, Marty. “Exploring The Spirit Of Women As Artists; IN HER OWN IMAGE: Women Working In The Arts.” Gay Community News 1981: 6–. Print.

 a b “Women and Music.” HERESIES, vol. 3, no. 2, 1980. http://heresiesfilmproject.org/archive/ 

^ Hedges, Elaine., and Ingrid Wendt. In Her Own Image, Women Working in the Arts. Old Westbury, N.Y. : New York: Feminist Press, 1980. Print.

1980 anthologies
Feminist art
Feminist literature
Literature by women